Thank You for Giving Me Your Valuable Time is the debut album by Norwegian pop/experimental/Avant-garde  Kaada. Initially released by EMI in 2001, it would be re-released in 2003 by Ipecac Recordings, with the track "Volkswagen" being removed.

Track listing

Note
 "Care" and "Thank You For Giving Me Your Valuable Time" are present in the soundtrack of the 2001 Norwegian film Mongoland.
 "Burden" is present in the soundtrack of the 2003 Swedish film Tur och retur (Swedish for "Round Trip").
 "Black California" has been recently featured in American advertisements for the 2014 Toyota Tundra.

External links
 Official website

2001 debut albums
Kaada albums
Ipecac Recordings albums